Flexor hallucis muscle may refer to:

 Flexor hallucis brevis muscle
 Flexor hallucis longus muscle